The River Frome  is a river in Dorset in the south of England. At 30 miles (48 km) long it is the major chalkstream in southwest England. It is navigable upstream from Poole Harbour as far as the town of Wareham.

Geography
The river rises in the Dorset Downs at Evershot, passes through Maiden Newton, Dorchester, West Stafford and Woodsford. At Wareham it and the parallel River Piddle flow into Poole Harbour via the Wareham Channel.

East of Dorchester the river runs over sands, clays and gravels which overlie the chalk; as the valley gradient is gentle the Frome has deposited much sediment here and thus created a broad floodplain. Historically this contained marshes and gave the name to the Durotriges, water dwellers, the Brittonic Celtic tribe who inhabited Dorset. The river forms a wide, shallow ria at its estuary, Poole Harbour.

Prior to the end of the last ice age, the Purbeck Hills were continuous with the Isle of Wight, and the Frome would have continued eastwards through what is now Poole Harbour and Poole Bay along the Solent, collecting the Stour–Avon, Beaulieu, and Test–Itchen–Hamble catchments, before emptying into the Channel between Bembridge and Selsey Bill.

Human history
At the end of the 1st century AD, the Romans built a  aqueduct to supply public fountains and public baths at their new town of Durnovaria (Dorchester). Taking the form of an open channel cut into the underlying chalk, the aqueduct took water from the Frome upstream near Notton (between modern-day Maiden Newton and Frampton) and closely followed the contours of the valley side to the southwest of the river. Over its course the aqueduct only fell , some  less than the river itself. It has been calculated that water would have reached Durnovaria at the rate of 8 million gallons per day. Some traces of the aqueduct terrace can still be seen at Bradford Peverell and on the Dorchester by-pass.

The Danes made frequent raids up the river. The town walls at Wareham were built in 876, possibly by Alfred the Great, to defend the town against this threat.

Until the late 19th century the river was an important part of the trade route for the export of Purbeck Ball Clay from the Isle of Purbeck. Originally the clay was brought to wharves at Wareham by pack horse from the clay pits to the south. In around 1830 the Furzebrook Railway was built, connecting the pits to a wharf at Ridge. This route was eventually superseded by the use of the main line rail network, and eventually by road.

Ecology
The Frome has suffered a dramatic decline in the run of salmon in recent years. In 1988 over 4000 fish ran the river, by 2004 the run had fallen to 750 fish. The Game & Wildlife Conservation Trust is carrying out research at its Salmon & Trout Research Centre at East Stoke into the decline of Atlantic Salmon to understand the causes and how to reverse the decline.

See also
Other River Fromes
Rivers of the United Kingdom
Geology of Dorset

References

External links
Game & Wildlife Conservation Trust Wild Salmon Recovery Project
Frome, Piddle & West Dorset Fisheries Association

Isle of Purbeck
Rivers of Dorset
Sites of Special Scientific Interest in Dorset
1Frome